The Classical Association of New England (CANE) is a professional organization for scholars and teachers of classical antiquity in the six New England states.  CANE was founded in 1906 by a group of "concerned collegiate Hellenists" led by George Edwin Howes of Williams College.  Howes became the first Secretary-Treasurer of CANE and served in that capacity until 1920.  Charles D. Adams of Dartmouth College was the first president.

CANE has always included both college and school teachers.  Of the seven papers presented at the first meeting, three were given by college faculty and four by high-school faculty  Since about 1995 it has been customary to elect the president alternately from school and college faculty, and the Annual Meeting is held on both college and school campuses throughout New England.

CANE holds an annual meeting in March of each year.  It publishes the New England Classical Journal and, through CANE Press, a collection of pedagogical materials.  Each summer CANE runs the CANE Summer Institute, a two-week intensive school with courses in classical literature, history, and art, and lectures open to the general public.

CANE Awards
CANE gives several awards to members, almost all named for members and benefactors of the association.  The oldest is the Cornelia Catlin Coulter Rome Scholarship, which provides funds for the recipient to attend the summer session of the American School of Classical Studies in Rome.  Cornelia C. Coulter (d. 1960), a professor at Mount Holyoke College, anonymously provided the first funds for this award in 1947, while she was president of CANE;  she later served as president of the American Philological Association.

The Matthew I. Wiencke Teaching Prize is awarded each year to a teacher in an elementary or secondary school.  It is named for Matthew I. Wiencke (d. 1997), of Dartmouth College.  He was one of the founders of the CANE Summer Institute and was executive secretary of CANE from 1989 to 1993.

The Edward Phinney Fellowship, awarded every three years since 1998, provides support for Ancient Greek programs in secondary schools.

The Phyllis B. Katz Student Prize for Excellence in Undergraduate Research is awarded each year to a student whose paper is accepted for presentation at the CANE annual meeting.  There is also a writing contest for high-school students.

The most prestigious of CANE's awards is the Barlow-Beach Award for Distinguished Service, awarded each year for "exceptional service to the classics in New England."  It is named for Claude Barlow and Goodwin Beach.  Barlow (d. 1976) was a long-time officer of CANE, including ten years as secretary-treasurer.  He was professor of classics at Mount Holyoke College and, later, at Clark University.  Beach (d. 1976), though not originally a classicist by profession, was a dedicated Latinist who became a teacher after retiring from a career in business.  He presented papers on both ancient Latin and neo-Latin at annual meetings over some thirty years and was instrumental in establishing an endowment for CANE.

Following are the recipients of the Barlow-Beach Award since its inception:
2023 Geoffrey Sumi
2022 Diane Anderson
2021 Mark Pearsall
2020 Elizabeth Keitel
2019 Sean Smith
2018 Jeri DeBrohun
2017 Kenneth S. Rothwell, Jr.
2016 John Higgins
2015 Jeremiah Mead
2014 Richard Clairmont
2013 Shirley Lowe
2012 Rosemary Zurawel
2011 Charlie Bradshaw
2010 Anne Mahoney
2009 John McVey
2008 Jacqueline M Carlon
2007 John Lawless
2006 Ray Starr
2005 Alison Barker, posthumous award
2004 Thomas Suits
2003 Ruth Breindel
2002 Donna Lyons
2001 Sister Mary Faith Dargan
2000 Zeph Stuart
1999 Allan B. Wooley
1998 Francis Royster Bliss
1997 Allen Mason Ward
1996 Phyllis B. Katz
1995 William F. Wyatt, Jr.
1994 Richard Desrosiers
1993 Reginald L. Hannaford
1992 Edward M. Bradley
1991 John C. Rouman
1990 Maureen Day Shugrue
1989 Matthew I. Wiencke
1988 John Carter Williams
1987 Gloria Duclos
1986 Sister Jeannette Plante
1985 Z. Philip Ambrose
1984 Joseph E. Desmond
1983 Anita Flannigan
1982 Mary Finnegan
1981 no awardee
1980 Nathan Dane II and Grace Crawford, posthumous award
1979 Gilbert Lawall
1978 Barbara McCarthy
1977 Dorothy Rounds

References

Bibliography
Z. Philip Ambrose.  "Re-reading the Classicists:  The First Meeting of the Classical Association of New
England, April 6–7, 1906."  NECJ 33.1 (Feb. 2006), 1–8.

Allan D. Wooley and Z. Philip Ambrose.  CANE's Centennial History:  A 100-Year Retrospective. Classical Association of New England, 2006.

External links
 CANE web site
 CANE Press

Linguistic societies
Academic organizations based in the United States
Classical associations and societies
Organizations established in 1906
1906 establishments in Massachusetts